PRL-8-53 is a nootropic research chemical derived from benzoic acid and phenylmethylamine (Benzylamine) that has been shown to act as a hypermnesic drug in humans; it was first synthesized by medical chemistry professor Nikolaus Hansl at Creighton University in the 1970s as part of his work on amino ethyl meta benzoic acid esters.

Nootropic effects

PRL-8-53 is not a medical treatment for disease or illness, although a nootropic effect in healthy individuals has been claimed. A single double-blind trial exploring the effects of PRL-8-53 in 47 healthy volunteers on various cognitive tasks remains the only human trial of PRL-8-53 to date. In the study, 5 mg of the drug was administered orally 2–2.5 hours before study tasks. Overall improvements in recollection differed between subject groups when compared to their respective placebo scores. Poorer performers (six words or fewer) showed an 87.5-105% increase in recollection while higher performers (eight or more words) exhibited a smaller 7.9-14% increase that failed to reach statistical significance. Older subjects (<30 years old) experienced an average 108-152% increase in recollection. The researchers noted that this was likely a result of a ceiling effect due to many study participants scoring close to 100% on the recall test even on placebo. No side effects were reported throughout the trial.

Mechanism of action
The exact mechanism of action of PRL-8-53 remains unknown. Doses up to 200 mg/kg are not observed to have stimulant properties, and a dosage of 20 mg/kg does not potentiate the effects of dextroamphetamine in rats. It displays possible cholinergic properties, and potentiates dopamine while partially inhibiting serotonin. PRL-8-53 reverses the catatonic and ptotic effects of reserpine.

Toxicity

PRL-8-53 is relatively non-toxic, with an oral  in mice of 860 mg/kg, giving the drug a high therapeutic index. Doses above 8 mg/kg have brief hypotensive effects in canines. High doses depress motor activity in the rat and mouse, with the ED50 for a 50% reduction in motor activity of mice at 160 mg/kg. PRL-8-53 displays spasmolytic effects.

Reasons for discontinuation 
It is uncertain as to exactly why PRL-8-53's development was halted. PRL-8-53 did not exhibit obvious side effects that would warrant discontinuation in animals or in its single human trial. Factors not limited to the retirement of Dr. Nikolaus Hansl in 1985 and a lawsuit filed between Hansl and Creighton University may be to blame.

Hansl v. Creighton University 
On July 1, 1985 Dr. Nikolaus Hansl entered into a settlement agreement with Creighton University. The terms of the agreement guaranteed Dr. Hansl  access to his laboratory facilities and office space at the university for a period of 2 years. Upon returning from a 4-month absence. Hansl found that the refrigerator he had used to store various experimental compounds had been unplugged, purportedly rendering the compounds unusable. 

It is uncertain if samples of PRL-8-53 were stored in the fridge or if they would have been degraded significantly under room temperature conditions.

Patent 
Dr. Hansl's patent for the synthesis of PRL-8-53 has expired.

Synonyms
Methyl 3-(2-(benzylmethylamino)ethyl)benzoate hydrochloride
3-(2-benzylmethylaminoethyl) benzoic acid methyl ester hydrochloride
3-(2-(Methyl(phenylmethyl)amino)ethyl)benzoic acid methyl ester hydrochloride

See also 
 Nootropic

References 

Benzoate esters
Nootropics
Local anesthetics